Mirbelia pungens, commonly known as prickly mirbelia,  is a species of flowering plant in the family Fabaceae and is endemic to south-eastern continental Australia. It is an erect or prostrate shrub with sharply-pointed linear leaves and orange-red flowers with blue or purple markings.

Description
The standard petal is orange-red with blue or purple markings, the keel purplish and nearly as long as the wings.

Taxonomy
Mirbelia pungens was first formally described in 1832 by George Don in A General History of Dichlamydeous Plants from an unpublished manuscript by Allan Cunningham. The specific epithet (pungens) means "ending in a sharp, hard point".

Distribution and habitat
This mirbelia grows in stony areas in heath and is widespread in south-eastern Queensland, New South Wales, the Australian Capital Territory and in the far north-east of Victoria.

Conservation status
Mirbelia pungens is listed as "vulnerable in Victoria" on the Victorian Department of Sustainability and Environment's Advisory List of Rare Or Threatened Plants In Victoria.

References

Mirbelioids
confertiflora
Fabales of Australia
Flora of New South Wales
Flora of Victoria (Australia)
Flora of Queensland
Plants described in 1977